is a retired Japanese swimmer who won three medals at the 1962 Asian Games. He competed in the 100 m freestyle and 4 × 100 m freestyle relay events at the 1964 Summer Olympics and finished fourth in the relay.

References

1941 births
Living people
Japanese male freestyle swimmers
Swimmers at the 1964 Summer Olympics
Swimmers at the 1962 Asian Games
Olympic swimmers of Japan
Asian Games medalists in swimming
Asian Games gold medalists for Japan
Asian Games silver medalists for Japan
Medalists at the 1962 Asian Games
20th-century Japanese people
21st-century Japanese people